Allemann is a surname (a variant of Allman, Alleman). Notable people with the surname include:

Anton Allemann (1936–2008), Swiss footballer
Cyndie Allemann (born 1986), Swiss race driver
Ken Allemann (born 1984), Swiss race driver
Rudolf K. Allemann, Swiss biological chemist, professor at Cardiff University
Urs Allemann (born 1948), Swiss writer and journalist
Willy Allemann (born 1942), Swiss footballer

See also
Alleman
Aleman (surname)
 

Surnames of Swiss origin
Ethnonymic surnames